Willard Drug Treatment Campus was a specialized state prison in Seneca County, New York, United States.  The prison focuses on treatment of drug-addicted convicts.  Willard Drug Treatment Campus is located in Willard, a community in the Town of Romulus, and is adjacent to Seneca Lake in the Finger Lakes Region.

Willard is a 900-bed intensive "boot-camp" style drug treatment campus for men and women.  This voluntary 97-day treatment program provides a sentencing option for individuals convicted of a drug offense and parole violators who otherwise would have been returned to a state prison in most cases for a year or more.  The facility is operated by the New York State Department of Corrections and Community Supervision in conjunction with the Division of Parole and is licensed by the state Office of Alcoholism and Substance Abuse Services (OASAS).

History
The drug treatment campus was opened in 1995 on the site of the former Willard Psychiatric State Hospital, a facility for mental patients.

The Paranormal Research Society, headquartered at Pennsylvania State University, investigated the drug treatment campus and featured it on a season one episode of Paranormal State titled "The Asylum."

References

Prisons in New York (state)
Buildings and structures in Seneca County, New York
1995 establishments in New York (state)